Anterior canal may refer to:

Anterior ethmoidal foramen
Anterior semicircular canal